The Top Four Cup was a football competition played between the top four clubs in the Irish League from 1965–66 to 1968–69. It was a knock-out competition, consisting of two semi-finals and a final.

Final results

Sources
W.H.W. Platt (1986) A History of Derry City Football and Athletic Club 1929-1972.
Bill Irwin (ed.) (1969) Irish Association Football Guide: Season 1969-70. Belfast: Century Newspapers Ltd
Bill Irwin (ed.) (1968) Irish Association Football Guide: Season 1968-69. Belfast: Century Newspapers Ltd
Bill Irwin (ed.) (1967) Irish Association Football Guide: Season 1967-68. Belfast: Century Newspapers Ltd
Irish Football Club Project

External links
 Top Four Cup results at the Irish Football Club Project
Irish League Archive - Top Four Cup

Defunct association football cup competitions in Northern Ireland
Northern Ireland